Nantithet is a hamlet near Cury in west Cornwall, England.

References

Hamlets in Cornwall